The In-Laws is a 2003 American action comedy film starring Michael Douglas, Albert Brooks, Robin Tunney, Ryan Reynolds and Candice Bergen. The film is a remake of the original 1979 cult classic of the same name. Scenes for the 2003 film were shot on location in Chicago. The film was a box office failure and received mixed to negative reviews.

Plot 

Steve Tobias is an undercover agent of the CIA whose son, Mark, is marrying Melissa Peyser. Her father is mild-mannered foot doctor, Jerry Peyser. When the two families meet for dinner, Peyser stumbles on to Steve Tobias' secret operation as Tobias tries to set up a deal to sell a Russian submarine, the Olga, to an arms smuggler in France as bait to catch arms smugglers. As Peyser's incidental involvement increases, he is suspected by the FBI of being part of a seemingly malicious deal. Peyser does not want to be involved in the deal or with Tobias' family but is either dragged in against his will or tricked into participating in wild escapades with Tobias. The two future fathers-in-law end up dodging bullets, jumping off buildings, and stealing jets together as they attempt to avoid capture by the FBI. After the wedding reception is ended by a last chase scene, they are finally left alone with only their children and wives to have a quiet marriage ceremony, presided over by the FBI agent who was chasing them.

Cast

Reception

Box office 
The film was released in theaters on May 23, 2003, opening against Bruce Almighty in North America. It finished its first weekend in 5th place with $7,319,848. It was a box office disappointment, ultimately recouping just under $27 million of its $40 million budget.

Critical response 
The In-Laws had a mixed to negative critical reception. Rotten Tomatoes gives the film a 33% score, based on 136 reviews, with an average rating of 5.00/10. The website’s critics consensus states: "Bigger and slicker than the original, but not necessarily better". On Metacritic, it has a score of 46 out of 100 based on 32 critics’ reviews, indicating "mixed or average reviews".

Roger Ebert of the Chicago Sun-Times awarded the film 2 out of 4 stars, writing "The In-Laws is an accomplished but not inspired remake of a 1979 comedy which was inspired and so did not need to be accomplished. The earlier movie was slapdash and at times seemed to be making itself up as it went along, but it had big laughs and a kind of lunacy. The remake knows the moves but lacks the recklessness." Ebert felt the remake lacked the comedic chemistry of Alan Arkin and Peter Falk in the original film, adding "Comedy works better when the characters seem utterly unaware that they are being funny." Michael Wilmington of the Chicago Tribune wrote, "You could say the same of Fleming, who's tended to work best when he's dealing with young protagonists, as in Dick, The Craft and Threesome. Fleming has a serious approach to comedy, visible here too, but drowned in the action and hoopla. He seems almost overwhelmed and the movie preposterously inflated."

See also 
 The In-Laws (1979 film)

References

External links 
 
 

2003 films
2003 action comedy films
2000s adventure comedy films
2000s buddy comedy films
2003 romantic comedy films
American action comedy films
American adventure comedy films
American buddy comedy films
American gang films
American heist films
American romantic comedy films
Remakes of American films
American chase films
2000s English-language films
Films about families
Films about weddings
Films directed by Andrew Fleming
Franchise Pictures films
Midlife crisis films
Films with screenplays by Ed Solomon
American vigilante films
Warner Bros. films
Films produced by Elie Samaha
Films scored by Klaus Badelt
2000s American films